Chloe Williams may refer to:

Chloe Williams (footballer) (born 2000), Wales international football midfielder
Chloe Williams (golfer) (born 1995), Welsh Ladies European Tour golfer
Chloe Williams (Left Behind) (née Steele), fictional character in the Left Behind franchise